The People's Army Newspaper is a Vietnamese newspaper headquartered in Hanoi. It is under the authority of the Central Military Commission of the Communist Party of Vietnam and the Ministry of National Defense, and it is practically the official press of the entire Vietnam People's Armed Forces and the People's Army of Vietnam. It is published in Vietnamese, English, Chinese, Lao and Khmer languages.

It was established as a revolutionary newspaper with the name Vệ quốc quân during the First Indochina War and later changed its name to Quân đội nhân dân.

References

External links
(English) People's Army Newspaper Online

Communist newspapers
Newspapers published in Vietnam
Vietnamese-language newspapers
English-language newspapers published in Asia
Publications with year of establishment missing
Mass media in Hanoi